Border Vengeance is a 1925 American silent Western film directed by Harry S. Webb and starring Jack Perrin, Josephine Hill and Tom London.

Cast
 Jack Perrin as Wes Channing 
 Josephine Hill as Mary Sims 
 Tom London as Flash Denby 
 Bud Osborne as Buck Littleton 
 Jack Richardson as Mark Newman - Assayer 
 Hugh Saxon as Rufe Sims 
 Vondell Darr as Bumps Jackson 
 Minna Redman as Mrs. Jackson 
 Robert MacFarland as Deputy Bill Jones

References

External links
 

1925 films
1925 Western (genre) films
Films directed by Harry S. Webb
1920s English-language films
Rayart Pictures films
American black-and-white films
Silent American Western (genre) films
1920s American films